Mikko Mattila (born 5 January 1953) is a Finnish sports shooter. He competed in two events at the 1984 Summer Olympics.

References

External links
 

1953 births
Living people
Finnish male sport shooters
Olympic shooters of Finland
Shooters at the 1984 Summer Olympics
People from Kouvola
Sportspeople from Kymenlaakso